Argyrophorus argenteus is a butterfly of the family Nymphalidae. It is found on the lower slopes of the Andes in Chile and Argentina.

The wingspan is about 40 mm.

The larvae feed on various grasses, including Stipa species.

Subspecies
Argyrophorus argenteus argenteus
Argyrophorus argenteus barrosi
Argyrophorus argenteus elinoides

References

Satyrini
Butterflies described in 1852